Cardno Point is a high flat-topped, tussock-covered headland forming the eastern extremity of Bird Island, off the west end of South Georgia. It was named by the UK Antarctic Place-Names Committee for Lieutenant Commander Peter G.N. Cardno, Royal Navy, navigating officer of HMS Owen, which made a hydrographic survey of the area in 1960–61.

References
 

Headlands of South Georgia and the South Sandwich Islands